Kunowo  is a village in the administrative district of Gmina Banie, within Gryfino County, West Pomeranian Voivodeship, in north-western Poland.

The village has a population of 360.

See also 

 History of Pomerania

References

Villages in Gryfino County